Kobelyaksky Uyezd (Кобелякский уезд) was one of the subdivisions of the Poltava Governorate of the Russian Empire. It was situated in the southern part of the governorate. Its administrative centre was Kobelyaki (Kobeliaky).

Demographics
At the time of the Russian Empire Census of 1897, Kobelyaksky Uyezd had a population of 227,795. Of these, 97.3% spoke Ukrainian, 1.6% Yiddish, 1.0% Russian and 0.1% Polish as their native language.

References

 
Uezds of Poltava Governorate
Poltava Governorate